Autobus S is a 1937 German comedy film directed by Heinz Hille and starring Hermann Speelmans, Carsta Löck, and Günther Lüders.

Cast

References

Bibliography

External links 
 

1937 films
1930s crime comedy films
German crime comedy films
Films of Nazi Germany
Films directed by Heinz Hille
Films set in Hamburg
German black-and-white films
1937 comedy films
1930s German films